Alyssa Mayo (born 10 February 2000) is an American tennis player.

Mayo made her WTA main draw debut at the 2017 Copa Colsanitas in the singles draw facing Sachia Vickery.

References

External links
 
 
 

2000 births
Living people
American female tennis players
Sportspeople from Naples, Florida
Tennis people from Florida
21st-century American women